Apertochrysa is a genus of green lacewings in the family Chrysopidae. There are 183 described species in the genus.

Taxonomy 
This genus was originally described in 1990 by Xing-ke Yang and Chi-kun Yang under the name of Navasius. The name was a homonym of Navasius Esben-Petersen, 1936, a species of antlion, so a replacement name of Dichochrysa was proposed by Yang in 1991. However, a ruling by the International Commission on Zoological Nomenclature instead maintained priority of the name Pseudomallada Tsukaguchi, 1995, thereby renaming the species previously described under the name of Dichochrysa. Further taxonomic work in 2021 synonymized those genera under Apertochrysa.

Distribution 
Apertochrysa is a Holarctic genus. Five species are described from North America. The majority of species are known from the Palearctic region, particularly from the continents of Asia and Africa.

Species
The following 183 species are currently classified under Apertochrysa:

 A. abdominalis (Brauer, 1856)
 A. aegyptiaca (Navás, 1915)
 A. afghanica (Hölzel, 1973)
 A. alarconi (Navás, 1915)
 A. albofrontata (C.-k. Yang et al., 1999)
 A. alcestes (Banks, 1911)
 A. alliumolens (Hölzel et al., 1997)
 A. allochroma (C.-k. Yang et al., 1999)
 A. alviolata (X.-k. Yang & C.-k. Yang, 1990)
 A. amseli (Hölzel, 1980)
 A. ancistroidea (X.-k. Yang & C.-k. Yang, 1990)
 A. angustivittata (Dong et al., 2004)
 A. anomala (Tillyard, 1917)
 A. arabica (Hölzel, 1995)
 A. arcuata (Dong et al., 2004)
 A. ariadne (Hölzel, 1978)
 A. aromatica (C.-k. Yang & X.-k. Yang, 1989)
 A. aspersa (Wesmael, 1841)
 A. astur (Banks, 1937)
 A. atrosparsa (Tjeder, 1966)
 A. australis (New, 1980)
 A. barkamana (C.-k. Yang et al., 1992)
 A. baronissa (Navás, 1921)
 A. basuto (Tjeder, 1966)
 A. benedictae (Séméria, 1976)
 A. bibens (Hölzel et al., 1997)
 A. birungana (Navás, 1924)
 A. brachychela (C.-k. Yang et al., 1999)
 A. budongensis (Hölzel, 2001)
 A. caffer (Tjeder, 1966)
 A. carinata (Dong et al., 2004)
 A. chailensis (Ghosh, 1977)
 A. chaoi (C.-k. Yang et al., 1999)
 A. chlorella (Navás, 1914)
 A. chloris (Schneider, 1851)
 A. choui (C.-k. Yang & X.-k. Yang, 1989)
 A. clathrata (Schneider, 1845)
 A. cognatella (Okamoto, 1914)
 A. collartina (Navás, 1932)
 A. congolana (Navás, 1911)
 A. cordata (X.-x. Wang & C.-k. Yang, 1992)
 A. cyprina (Navás, 1932)
 A. decaryna (Navás, 1924)
 A. decolor (Navás, 1914)
 A. decolor (Navás, 1936) (unreplaced junior homonym)
 A. deqenana (C.-k. Yang et al., 1992)
 A. derbendica (Hölzel, 1967)
 A. deserta (Navás, 1912)
 A. diaphana (C.-k. Yang et al., 1999)
 A. dubia (Hölzel 1973)
 A. duplicata (Navás, 1934)
 A. edwardsi (Banks, 1940)
 A. epunctata (X.-k. Yang & C.-k. Yang, 1990)
 A. eremita (Kimmins, 1955)
 A. estriata (C.-k. Yang et al., 1999)
 A. eumorpha (C.-k. Yang et al., 1999)
 A. eurydera (Navás, 1910)
 A. fanjingana (C.-k. Yang & X.-x. Wang, 1988)
 A. flammefrontata (C.-k. Yang et al., 1999)
 A. flavifrons (Brauer, 1851)
 A. flavinotala (Dong et al., 2004)
 A. flexuosa (X.-k. Yang & C.-k. Yang, 1990)
 A. forcipata (X.-k. Yang & C.-k. Yang, 1993)
 A. formosana (Matsumura, 1910)
 A. fortunata (McLachlan, 1882)
 A. fuscineura (C.-k. Yang et al., 1992)
 A. genei (Rambur, 1842)
 A. gradata (X.-k. Yang & C.-k. Yang, 1993)
 A. granadensis (Pictet, 1865)
 A. gravesi (Navás, 1926)
 A. gunvorae (Tjeder, 1966)
 A. hadimensis (Canbulat & Kiyak, 2005)
 A. hainana (X.-k. Yang & C.-k. Yang, 1990)
 A. hamata (Tjeder, 1966)
 A. handschini (Navás, 1929)
 A. healdi (Navás, 1926)
 A. hespera (X.-k. Yang & C.-k. Yang, 1990)
 A. heudei (Navás, 1934)
 A. hospitalis (Hölzel & Ohm, 1995)
 A. huashanensis (C.-k. Yang & X.-k. Yang, 1989)
 A. hubeiana (C.-k. Yang & X.-x. Wang, 1990)
 A. iberica (Navás, 1903)
 A. ifranina (Navás, 1936)
 A. ignea (X.-k. Yang & C.-k. Yang, 1990)
 A. illota (Navás, 1908)
 A. incongrua (Fraser, 1951)
 A. incrassata (Tjeder, 1966)
 A. ingae (Tjeder, 1966)
 A. iniqua (Navás, 1931)
 A. inopinata (Hölzel & Ohm, 1995)
 A. inornata (Navás, 1901)
 A. irrorella (Navás, 1936)
 A. jiuzhaigouana (X.-k. Yang & X.-x. Wang in X.-k. Yang et al., 2005)
 A. joannisi (Navás, 1910)
 A. karooensis (Hölzel, 1993)
 A. kiangsuensis (Navás, 1934)
 A. kibonotoensis (van der Weele, 1910)
 A. kinnaurensis (Gosh, 1977)
 A. leai (Tillyard, 1917) 
 A. lii (C.-k. Yang et al., 1999)
 A. longwangshana (X.-k. Yang, 1998)
 A. lophophora (X.-k. Yang & C.-k. Yang, 1990)
 A. luaboensis (Tjeder, 1966)
 A. luctuosa (Banks, 1911)
 A. macleodi (Adams and Garland, 1983)
 A. maghrebina (Hölzel & Ohm, 1984)
 A. makrana (Hölzel, 1966)
 A. mangkangensis (Dong et al., 2004)
 A. marchionissa (Navás, 1915)
 A. mauriciana (Hölzel & Ohm, 1991)
 A. mediata (X.-k. Yang & C.-k. Yang, 1993)
 A. medogana (C.-k. Yang et al. in Huang et al., 1988)
 A. melanopis (Navás, 1914)
 A. militaris (Hölzel & Ohm, 2000)
 A. mira (Hölzel, 1973)
 A. namibensis (Hölzel, 1993)
 A. nautarum (Tillyard, 1917) 
 A. nicolaina (Navás, 1929)
 A. nigra (McLachlan, 1869)
 A. nigricornuta (X.-k. Yang & C.-k. Yang, 1990)
 A. norfolkensis (Tillyard, 1917) 
 A. nubilata (Navás, 1910)
 A. nyassalandica (Navás, 1914)
 A. oralis (Navás, 1914)
 A. parabola (Okamoto, 1919)
 A. perfecta (Banks, 1895)
 A. perpallida (Tjeder, 1966)
 A. pervenosa (Tjeder, 1966)
 A. phantosula (X.-k. Yang & C.-k. Yang, 1990)
 A. phlebia (Navas, 1927)
 A. physophlebia (Navas, 1914)
 A. picteti (McLachlan, 1880)
 A. pieli (Navás, 1931)
 A. pilinota (Dong et al., 2004)
 A. prasina (Burmeister, 1839)
 A. pulchrina (Tjeder, 1966)
 A. puncticollis (Banks, 1940)
 A. punctilabris (McLachlan, 1894)
 A. punctithorax (New, 1980)
 A. qingchengshana (C.-k. Yang et al., 1992)
 A. qinlingensis (C.-k. Yang & X.-k. Yang, 1989)
 A. raedarii (Hölzel & Ohm, 2000)
 A. rothschildi (Navás, 1915)
 A. rubicunda (Hölzel, 1993)
 A. rubra (Hölzel et al., 1994)
 A. sana (X.-k. Yang & C.-k. Yang, 1990)
 A. sansibarica (Kolbe, 1897)
 A. selenia (Navás, 1912)
 A. sensitiva (Tjeder, 1940)
 A. setosa (Hölzel & Ohm, 1995)
 A. sierra (Banks, 1924)
 A. spadix (Hölzel, 1988)
 A. spissinervis (Tjeder, 1966)
 A. subcostalis (McLachlan, 1882)
 A. subcubitalis (Navás, 1901)
 A. subflavifrons (Tjeder, 1949)
 A. sybaritica (McLachlan in Fedchenko, 1875)
 A. tacta (Navás, 1921)
 A. teiresias (Hölzel & Ohm, 1982)
 A. triactinata (New, 1980)
 A. triangularis (Adams, 1978)
 A. triangularis (C.-k. Yang & X.-x. Wang, 1994) (unreplaced junior homonym)
 A. tridentata (X.-k. Yang & C.-k. Yang, 1990)
 A. truncatata (X.-k. Yang et al. in X.-k. Yang et al., 2005)
 A. umbrosa (Navás, 1914) 
 A. ussuriensis (Makarkin, 1985)
 A. varians (Kimmins, 1959)
 A. venosa (Rambur, 1838)
 A. venosella (Esben-Petersen, 1920)
 A. ventralis (Curtis, 1834)
 A. venusta (Hölzel, 1974)
 A. verna (C.-k. Yang & X.-k. Yang, 1989)
 A. viridifrons (Hölzel & Ohm, 1999)
 A. vitticlypea (C.-k. Yang & X.-x. Wang, 1990)
 A. waitei (Tillyard, 1917) 
 A. wangi (C.-k. Yang et al., 1992)
 A. wuchangana (C.-k. Yang & X.-x. Wang, 1990)
 A. xiamenana (C.-k. Yang et al., 1999)
 A. yangi (X.-k. Yang & X.-x. Wang in X.-k. Yang et al., 2005)
 A. yunnana (C.-k. Yang & X.-x. Wang, 1994)
 A. yuxianensis (Bian & Li, 1992)
 A. zelleri (Schneider, 1851)
 A. zulu (Tjeder, 1966)

References

Further reading

External links

 

Chrysopidae
Articles created by Qbugbot